Sağgöze is a village in the Genç District, Bingöl Province, Turkey. The village is populated by Kurds of the Ziktî tribe and had a population of 274 in 2021.

The hamlets of Bereket, Bozburun, Doyumlu, Durmuşlar, Kaymaz, Sevimli, Tanrıverdi, Taşlık and Yenice are attached to the village.

References 

Villages in Genç District
Kurdish settlements in Bingöl Province